Watson McLean Washburn (June 13, 1894 – December 2, 1973) was an American tennis player who was in the top 10 in the US seven times between 1914 and 1922. He was also one of the founders of the International Tennis Hall of Fame, to which he was inducted in 1965. He also competed at the 1924 Summer Olympics.

Biography
He was born in Manhattan on June 13, 1894.

He was primarily a doubles player and teamed with Richard Norris Williams to take the Davis Cup in 1921. Also with Williams, he reached two US Championship finals and one at Wimbledon. He won the US Intercollegiate Doubles Championship in 1913 and the Indoor Doubles Championship in 1915. In July 1915, Washburn and Williams won the doubles title at the Eastern Tennis Championship in Brookline defeating Irving C. Wright and Wallace F. Johnson in four sets.

In 1917, Washburn joined the American Expeditionary Forces and served during World War I in France as a captain in the artillery.

In 1921, Washburn defeated Richard Norris Williams in the final of the Newport Casino Invitational in five sets.

After his tennis career, he became an assistant state prosecutor.

Grand Slam finals

Doubles (3 runners-up)

References

External links
 
 
 
 

American male tennis players
Sportspeople from Manhattan
Tennis people from New York (state)
1894 births
1973 deaths
International Tennis Hall of Fame inductees
Olympic tennis players of the United States
Tennis players at the 1924 Summer Olympics
Harvard Crimson men's tennis players
Columbia Law School alumni